The President of the Chamber of Deputies (Spanish: Presidente de la Cámara de Diputados) is the presiding officer of the Chamber of Deputies of Mexico. This position is analogous to the Speaker of the House in other legislatures. The incumbent president is Sergio Gutiérrez Luna. The president is elected for a one-year term.

One of the main characteristics of the position is assuming the role of President of the Congress of the Union during joint-sessions of General Congress, including: the ceremonial opening of ordinary (and extraordinary) legislative periods, the inaugural ceremony of the President of Mexico where this presiding officer receives the presidential sash from the outgoing president to deliver it to the incoming president, and the reception of the President of Mexico's yearly government report at the beginning of every legislative year (traditionally a speech to Congress but also delivered in writing without the President's attendance since 2007) as well as delivering the official response (contestación) to the speech on behalf of Congress.

List of presidents of the Chamber of Deputies

Mexico (1822–1824) 
During First Mexican Empire, Provisional Government of Mexico.

Mexico (1825–1853) 
During the First Mexican Republic, Centralist Republic of Mexico and Second Federal Republic of Mexico.

Mexico 1856–1857 
Presidents of the Constituent Congress of 1857.

Mexico 1857–1863 
Presidents of the Chamber of Deputies under the Constitution of 1857.

Mexico 1867–1917 
Presidents of the Chamber of Deputies after the Second French intervention in Mexico.

Modern Mexico after 1917 
After the 1917 Constitution of Mexico was taken into use.

References

Presidents of the Chamber of Deputies (Mexico)
Mexico
Congress of the Union
President